Illuminaudio is the third studio album by American post-hardcore band Chiodos. It was released on October 5, 2010 through Equal Vision Records. Illuminaudio is the first and only studio album from the band with vocalist Brandon Bolmer, formerly of Yesterdays Rising, after the departure of Craig Owens. Owens would return to the band in 2012, replacing Bolmer. This is also the first and only album with drummer Tanner Wayne, formerly of Underminded. He would leave the band in 2012, to be replaced by former drummer Derrick Frost. This is also the last album with original guitarist Jason Hale. He would leave the band in 2012 to be replaced by The Fall of Troy's guitarist and vocalist Thomas Erak. As of March 2014, the album has sold 49,000 copies in the United States.

Track listing

Allusions
 The song "Stratovolcano Mouth" borrows some elements from the song "Thermacare," aka "The Only Thing You Talk About," a demo done with Craig Owens in late 2009, which leaked in August 2010 and turned into a song by his new band D.R.U.G.S.
 The song "Hey Zeus! The Dungeon" has lyrics that detail story elements of The Phantom of the Opera.
 The song entitled "Love Is a Cat from Hell" is in reference to Bukowski's collection of poems entitled "Love Is a Dog from Hell".
 The song "Modern Wolf Hair" is a play on words of the title of the videogame "Call of Duty: Modern Warfare".
 The song "Those Who Slay Together, Stay Together" references the title of the Venture Bros' season 3 finale episodes: The Family That Slays Together, Stays Together (Part I) and The Family That Slays Together, Stays Together (Part II).

Personnel

Musicians 
Credits for Illuminaudio adapted from Allmusic.

Chiodos
 Bradley Bell – keyboards, piano, synthesizers, programming
 Brandon Bolmer – lead vocals
 Matt Goddard – bass guitar
 Jason Hale – lead guitar
 Pat McManaman – rhythm guitar
 Tanner Wayne – drums, percussion

Guest musicians
 Vic Fuentes – additional vocals on track 3

Production
Produced and mixed by Machine
Engineered by Will Putney and Jeremy Comitas
Mastered by Scott Hull
Additional programming and sound design by Christopher «Notes» Olsen

Editing by Bill Purcell and Jay Sayong
A&R by D. Sandshaw
Artwork by Kyle Crawford
Photography by Tim Harmon

Charts
Album

References

Chiodos albums
Equal Vision Records albums
Albums produced by Machine (producer)